Paul Albert Anka  (born July 30, 1941) is a Canadian-American singer, songwriter and actor. He is best known for his signature hit songs including "Diana", "Lonely Boy", "Put Your Head on My Shoulder", and "(You're) Having My Baby". Anka also wrote the theme for The Tonight Show Starring Johnny Carson; one of Tom Jones' biggest hits, "She's a Lady"; and the English lyrics to Claude François and Jacques Revaux's music for Frank Sinatra's signature song "My Way", which has been recorded by many, including Elvis Presley.  He co-wrote three songs with Michael Jackson: "This Is It" (originally titled "I Never Heard") "Love Never Felt So Good", and "Don't Matter to Me", which became posthumous hits for Jackson in 2009, 2014, and 2018, respectively.

Early life
Anka was born in Ottawa, Ontario, to Camelia (née Tannis) and Andrew Emile "Andy" Anka Sr., who owned a restaurant called the Locanda. His parents were both of Lebanese Christian descent. His father came to Canada  from Bab Tuma, Damascus, Syria, and his mother was an immigrant from Lebanon. His mother died when he was 18.

Anka sang with the St. Elias Antiochian Orthodox Cathedral choir under the direction of Frederick Karam, with whom he studied music theory. He studied piano with Winnifred Rees. He attended Fisher Park High School, where he was part of a vocal trio called the Bobby Soxers.

Career

Early success

Paul Anka recorded his first single, "I Confess", when he was 14. In 1956, with $100 given to him by his uncle, he went to New York City where he auditioned for Don Costa at ABC Records, singing what was widely believed to be a lovestruck verse he had written to a former babysitter. In an interview with NPR's Terry Gross in 2005, he stated that it was to a girl at his church whom he hardly knew. The resulting song "Diana" brought Anka stardom as it went to  1 on the Canadian and US music charts. "Diana" is one of the best selling singles ever by a Canadian recording artist. He followed up with four songs that made it into the Top 20 in 1958, including "It's Time to Cry", which hit  4 and "(All of a Sudden) My Heart Sings", which reached  15, making him (at 17) one of the biggest teen idols of the time. He toured Britain, then Australia with Buddy Holly. Anka also wrote "It Doesn't Matter Anymore" – a song written for Holly, which Holly recorded just before he died in 1959. Anka stated shortly afterward:

Paul Anka's talent included the theme for The Tonight Show Starring Johnny Carson (reworked in 1962 from a song Anka wrote earlier called "Toot Sweet"; it had been rewritten with lyrics and recorded by Annette Funicello in 1959 as "It's Really Love"). He wrote "Teddy" – a Top 20 hit for Connie Francis in 1960. Anka wrote the English lyrics to "My Way", Frank Sinatra's signature song (originally the French song "Comme d'habitude"). In the 1960s, Anka began acting in motion pictures as well as writing songs for them, most notably the theme for the hit film The Longest Day (which also was the official march of the Canadian Airborne Regiment), in which he made a cameo appearance as a U.S. Army Ranger. For his film work he wrote and recorded one of his greatest hits "Lonely Boy". He also wrote and recorded "My Home Town", which was a  8 pop hit for him the same year. He then went on to become one of the first pop singers to perform at the Las Vegas casinos. In 1960, he appeared twice as himself in NBC's short-lived crime drama Dan Raven.

In 1963, Anka purchased the rights and ownership of his ABC-Paramount catalog and re-recorded his earlier hits for RCA Victor, which he had joined in 1960.  Like many American recording artists of the mid 1960s, Anka's career was derailed by the British Invasion. By the end of the decade, he focused mainly on adult contemporary and big-band standards and began appearing regularly in Las Vegas.

In the early 1970s, Anka signed with Buddah Records, releasing  two albums, the self-titled Paul Anka and Jubilation.  The former, first released in 1971, included the track "She's a Lady", a song Anka composed that would become the biggest hit for Welsh singer Tom Jones that same year. Anka's version failed to become a chart success.

1970s chart comeback

Frustrated after more than ten years without a top 25 hit record, Anka switched labels again, which marked a turning point in his career. This time he signed with United Artists and in 1974 teamed up with Odia Coates to record the  1 hit, "(You're) Having My Baby", exposing Anka to a new generation of fans and proved his staying power among his original fan base that was now maturing.

Anka also wrote five songs which were included on an album by Don Goodwin.

Anka and Coates would record three more duets that made it into the Top 10, "One Man Woman/One Woman Man" ( 7), "I Don't Like to Sleep Alone" ( 8), and the  15 duet "(I Believe) There's Nothing Stronger Than Our Love". In 1975, he recorded a jingle for Kodak written by Bill Lane (lyrics) and Roger Nichols (melody) called "Times of Your Life". It became so popular Anka recorded it as a full song, which peaked at  7 in the US pop chart in 1976. The follow-up was another hit that Anka wrote for Sinatra, "Anytime (I'll Be There)", peaking at  33. Anka's last Top 40 hit in the US was in the summer of 1983: "Hold Me 'Til the Mornin' Comes", which included backing vocals from then-Chicago frontman Peter Cetera; it hit  2 on the Hot Adult Contemporary chart.

1990s comeback
Anka's 1998 album A Body of Work was his first new US studio release since Walk a Fine Line in 1983; vocalists and performers included Celine Dion, Kenny G, Patti LaBelle, and Skyler Jett. The album included a new version of "Hold Me 'Til the Morning Comes", once again performed with Peter Cetera. In 2005, Anka released an album of big-band arrangements of contemporary Rock songs titled, Rock Swings; the album provided a mainstream comeback of sorts that saw Anka awarded a star on Canada's Walk of Fame in Toronto.

On October 12, 2009, Anka stated that Michael Jackson's new release titled "This Is It" was a collaborative effort between the two in 1983. According to Anka, after recording the song, Jackson decided not to use it and the tune was then recorded and released by Sa-Fire. After Anka threatened to sue for credit and a share of royalties, the administrators of Jackson's estate granted Anka 50% of the copyright. An additional song that Jackson co-wrote with Anka from this 1983 session, "Love Never Felt So Good", was discovered shortly thereafter. His album Songs of December charted at  58 in Canada in November 2011.

Italy
Anka collaborated with a number of Italian musicians, including composer/director Ennio Morricone, singer-songwriter Lucio Battisti, and lyricist Mogol. His official discography reports nine singles released by RCA Italiana, but the Italian charts list at least six other songs he interpreted or recorded in Italian. His top hit was "Ogni giorno" which scored  1 in 1962, followed by "Piangerò per te" and "Ogni volta", which reached both  2, in 1963 and 1964. "Ogni volta" ("Every Time") was sung by Anka during the Festival di Sanremo of 1964 and then sold more than one million copies in Italy alone; it was also awarded a gold disc.

He returned to Sanremo in 1968 with "La farfalla impazzita" by Battisti-Mogol. On that occasion, the same title was interpreted by Italian crooner Johnny Dorelli. The pair of singers, however, were eliminated before the final stage of the musical contest. Anka, maybe only coincidentally, left the Italian scene shortly thereafter. In 2003, Anka came back with an exclusive concert in Bologna, organized by the Italian company Mapei during the CERSAIE exhibition. He recorded a version of "My Way" with alternate lyrics dedicated to the sponsor of the evening. 

In 2006, he recorded a duet with 1960s Italian hitmaker Adriano Celentano, a new cover of "Diana", with Italian lyrics by Celentano-Mogol and with singer-songwriter Alex Britti on the guitar. The song hit  3.

Finland

Paul Anka has been very popular in Finland since the beginning of his career. He performed in Helsinki's Linnanmäki in 1959, in Lappeenranta in 1989, at the Pori Jazz Festival in Pori on 19 July 2007 and in 2012, and in Tampere three times on 6 August 2008 and on 9 and 10 August 2009. He also appeared in the Las Vegas scene in the 1991 Finnish film Prince of the Hit Parade (Iskelmäprinssi), directed by Juha Tapaninen. At the end of the film there is an archive footage of Anka's performance in Linnanmäki. As background music, Anka performs his song "How Long" in the film.

Other countries
With less success than in Italy and Finland, Anka tried the French market as well, with his first song being "Comme Avant" with Mireille Mathieu. In 1964 he released an album titled Paul Anka à Paris; the six tracks on side B were sung in French. A single release in Japanese ("Kokoro no Sasae"/"Shiawase e no Tabiji") is also reported on his discography. In 1993, he recorded a duet with Filipino singer Regine Velasquez titled "It's Hard to Say Goodbye", included on her album Reason Enough. This song was re-recorded several years later by Anka and Celine Dion and was included on his album A Body of Work.

Anka has performed four times in Israel, and in 2019 rejected pleas that he boycott the country.

Personal life

Anka was married to Anne de Zogheb, the daughter of a Lebanese diplomat, Charles de Zogheb, from February 16, 1963 until 2001. The couple met in 1962 in San Juan, Puerto Rico, where she was a fashion model on assignment and under contract to the Eileen Ford Agency. Zogheb, brought up in Egypt, is of Lebanese, English, French, Dutch, and Greek descent. The couple married the following year in a ceremony at Paris-Orly Airport. Through his daughter Amanda, he is the father-in-law of the actor Jason Bateman.

On September 6, 1990, he became a naturalized citizen of the United States.

In 2008, Anka married his personal trainer, Anna Åberg, in Sardinia, Italy. They divorced in 2010, and Paul has full custody of their son. Anna was featured in the Swedish TV3 show Svenska Hollywoodfruar (Swedish Hollywood Wives).

Anka's autobiography, My Way, co-written with David Dalton, was published in 2013.

In October 2016, Anka married Lisa Pemberton in Beverly Hills, California. They divorced in 2020.

Acting career

Anka's first acting role in a major film was in a cameo as an army private in The Longest Day (1962). He also composed the title song to the movie. During the late 1950s and early 1960s, he starred in such teen exploitation films as Girls Town (1959) and Look in Any Window (1961), in which he played a peeping tom. He later played an Elvis-hating casino pit manager in 3000 Miles to Graceland (2001) and a yacht broker in Captain Ron (1992). He guest-starred as a murder suspect in one of the Perry Mason Made-for-TV movies, The Case of the Maligned Mobster (1991). He made guest appearances as himself in the episode "Red's Last Day" on That '70s Show and in "The Real Paul Anka" episode of Gilmore Girls. He made several appearances on the NBC TV series Las Vegas. In 2016, he made another guest appearance as himself in the "Spring" episode of Gilmore Girls: A Year in the Life, a revival of the original show.

Other film and television appearances
Anka was the subject of the 1962 National Film Board of Canada documentary Lonely Boy, considered a classic work of cinema verite. He wrote and performed songs in the 1985 Canadian children's Christmas cartoon George and the Christmas Star. He appeared on The Simpsons season 7 episode Treehouse of Horror VI, Attack of the 50 Ft Eyesore, singing a song with Lisa in October 1995. In American Idols seasons 2 and 3, he made a special appearance and sang an adapted version of "My Way" that mocked the format of the show, as well as participants, judges, and the host. The performance was praised as one of the best moments of the show.

Anka competed in season four of The Masked Singer as "Broccoli". He ended up finishing in 7th place during the Group C finals.

On Gilmore Girls, Lorelai Gilmore named her Polish Lowland Sheepdog after Anka. Series co-creator Daniel Palladino chose the name after hearing the Rock Swings album at a coffeehouse. In the cold open to the episode "The Real Paul Anka", both Paul Ankas were featured in a dream sequence Lorelai describes to her daughter Rory.

Anka appeared as himself in the American sitcom That 70s Show in season 2, episode 2 “Red’s Last Day”.

Anka appeared in an episode of The Morecambe and Wise Show in 1970, singing his own lyrics 'My Way'. The show was broadcast again on BBC2 on Christmas Day 2021 after the tape recording - believed lost - was found.

Awards and honours

In 1972, a street in Ottawa was named Paul Anka Drive. In 1981, the Ottawa City Council named August 26 as "Paul Anka Day" to celebrate his quarter-century in show business.

Anka won the Juno Award for Composer of the Year (an award given for songwriting) in 1975. He has been nominated for Juno Awards many other times. He was inducted into the Canadian Music Hall of Fame in 1980.

Anka was made an Officer of the Order of Canada in October 2004.

Anka was inducted into Canada's Walk of Fame in 2005.

In popular culture 
In the mid-1980s, Anka was secretly recorded while launching a tirade against his crew and band members, berating them for behavior that he considered unprofessional. When asked about it on the interview program Fresh Air, he referred to the person who did the recording as a "snake we later fired". The recording became widely known after being uploaded to the internet around 2004, and a number of quotes from it became famous, including "The guys get shirts!"; "Don't make a maniac out of me!"; and "Slice like a fucking hammer". Some of the quotes were reproduced verbatim by Al Pacino's character in the 2007 film Ocean's Thirteen. In the TV show Gilmore Girls, Lorelai Gilmore names her dog Paul Anka.

Business ventures
In 1978, Anka opened Jubilation, a restaurant and club considered one of the first modern-era nightclubs in Las Vegas; County Commissioner Chris Giunchigliani was its first female bartender.

In 2012, Anka co-founded the holographic tech startup, ARHT Media. He is currently a member of ARHT Media's Board of Advisors, alongside Kevin O'Leary and Brian Mulroney.

Discography

Albums

Filmography

References

Works cited
 36 People Magazine November 7, 2016, p. 13

External links

 
 
 
 
 
 
 Portrait of Paul Anka standing on a balcony in Los Angeles, California, 1975. Los Angeles Times Photographic Archive (Collection 1429). UCLA Library Special Collections, Charles E. Young Research Library, University of California, Los Angeles.

1941 births
20th-century American male actors
20th-century American male singers
20th-century American singers
20th-century Canadian male actors
20th-century Canadian male singers
21st-century American male actors
21st-century American male singers
21st-century American singers
21st-century Canadian male actors
21st-century Canadian male singers
ABC Records artists
American crooners
American jazz singers
American male film actors
American male jazz musicians
American male pop singers
American male singer-songwriters
American people of Lebanese descent
American people of Syrian descent
American soft rock musicians
Ballad musicians
Buddah Records artists
Canadian emigrants to the United States
Canadian expatriate musicians in the United States
Canadian jazz singers
Canadian male film actors
Canadian male jazz musicians
Canadian male singers
Canadian male singer-songwriters
Canadian Music Hall of Fame inductees
Canadian people of Arab descent
Canadian people of Lebanese descent
Canadian pop singers
Canadian soft rock musicians
Chevaliers of the Ordre des Arts et des Lettres
Columbia Records artists
EMI Records artists
Juno Award for Songwriter of the Year winners
Living people
Male actors from Ottawa
Middle Eastern Christians
Musicians from Ottawa
Naturalized citizens of the United States
Officers of the Order of Canada
RCA Victor artists
RPM Records (United States) artists
Swing singers